This is a list of all the episodes for the British sitcom Terry and June, which originally aired on BBC1 from 24 October 1979 to 31 August 1987.

Each episode is approximately 30 minutes long. The first seven series had six episodes each, with the eighth series consisting of 12 episodes and the ninth (and final) series seven episodes.

The first series aired from 24 October to 28 November 1979 on Wednesdays at 8.30pm. The second series from 5 September to 10 October 1980 on Fridays at 8.20pm, followed by a Christmas special on 23 December 1980 at 7.15pm. Series Three aired on Fridays at 7.30pm from 13 November to 18 December 1981, with a Christmas special on 28 December 1981 at 6.35pm, and the fourth series aired from 5 January to 9 February 1982 on Tuesdays at 8.00pm.

The fifth series aired from 19 October to 23 November 1982 on Tuesdays at 7.40pm. The 1982 Christmas special aired on Christmas Eve at 8.40pm. Series Six aired from 15 February to 22 March 1983 on Tuesdays at 7.50pm, followed by Series Seven from 31 October to 12 December 1983 on Mondays at 6.50pm.

The eighth (and penultimate) series aired from 7 September to 23 November 1985 on Saturdays at 5.50pm. Series Eight's unusual episode count (twelve episodes, originally thirteen before an episode was dropped, and the 1985 Christmas Special which was filmed as part of the Series Eight filming block) owes to the fact that it was originally penned as a double-length series, that the BBC could choose to break over two separate series of broadcasts if they so opted to, as they had done with Series Three and Four; and the DVD releases also reflect this option by releasing Series Eight as two halves, although ultimately Series Eight was broadcast as one long series. A run-down of upcoming episodes in several BBC in-house literature for the then-forthcoming 1984-85 production season makes mention of an ultimately 'missing' final episode of Series 8, "Computer Games"; Although a script for this episode exists, the episode doesn't appear to have entered production, seemingly due to the final recording slot instead given over to recording the 1985 Christmas Special.

Series Eight was followed by a Christmas special on 24 December 1985 at 9.00pm. The ninth (and final) series aired from 20 July to 31 August 1987 on Mondays at 8.30pm. Several scripts for a proposed Series Ten were submitted, but the series was not renewed.

Series One (1979)

Series Two (1980)

Christmas Special (1980)

Series Three (1981)

Christmas Special (1981)

Series Four (early 1982)

Series Five (1982)

Christmas Special (1982)

Series Six (spring 1983)

Series Seven (1983)

Series Eight (1985)

Christmas Special (1985)

Series Nine (1987)

References 

 British TV Comedy Guide for Terry and June

Lists of British sitcom episodes